大妈 may refer to:
Big mama, a Chinese language neologism for an Internet censor
Chinese dama, a term for describing Chinese middle-aged women